The following lists events that happened in 1947 in El Salvador.

Incumbents
President: Salvador Castaneda Castro
Vice President: Manuel Adriano Vilanova

Events

February

 16 February – C.D. FAS, a Salvadoran football club, was established.

Births

 22 November – Alfredo Cristiani, politician

References

 
El Salvador
1940s in El Salvador
Years of the 20th century in El Salvador
El Salvador